is a Japanese football player. He plays for ReinMeer Aomori.

Early life

Hiratsuka was born in Gifu Prefecture.

Career

Youth club career

As a youth player, Hiratsuka joined JUVEN FC. During junior high school, Hiratsuka played for Gifu VAMOS, the team that produced 2013 FIFA U-17 World Cup player Taro Sugimoto, and was selected for the prefecture team. After failing a trial with the youth academy of J1 League club Nagoya Grampus and receiving an invitation from a private school in Shizuoka Prefecture, he joined the youth academy of J1 League club Shimizu S-Pulse after a trial, initially struggling with the level of play.

Senior club career

Jin Hiratsuka joined J1 League club Shimizu S-Pulse in 2017. On 12 April 2017, he debuted for Shimizu S-Pulse during a 0–1 loss to Consadole Sapporo. He made three appearances for Shimizu S-Pulse. In 2020, he was sent on loan to Fujieda MYFC in J3 League, becoming the youngest player on the team. In 2021, he signed for Suzuka Point Getters but left at the end of the 2021 season. In 2022, he signed for ReinMeer Aomori.

International career

He has been selected by Japan at Under-18 level.

Style of play

Hiratsuka is left-footed and known for his goalscoring ability as well as height.

Club statistics
Updated to 18 February 2019.

References

External links
Profile at Shimizu S-Pulse

1999 births
Living people
Association football people from Gifu Prefecture
Japanese footballers
J1 League players
Shimizu S-Pulse players
Association football forwards